Yasutoshi Tagami (born 15 February 1934) is a Japanese sailor. He competed in the Flying Dutchman event at the 1964 Summer Olympics.

References

External links
 

1934 births
Living people
Japanese male sailors (sport)
Olympic sailors of Japan
Sailors at the 1964 Summer Olympics – Flying Dutchman
Place of birth missing (living people)